Vernicha James (born 6 June 1984) is a former English sprinter who competed in 100 metres, 200 metres, 4 x 100 metre relay and 4 x 400 metre relay events. She was a double European junior champion and a three-time medalist at the World Junior Championships.

References

1984 births
Living people
Athletes from London
British female sprinters
English female sprinters
Athletes (track and field) at the 2002 Commonwealth Games
Commonwealth Games medallists in athletics
Commonwealth Games bronze medallists for England
Medallists at the 2002 Commonwealth Games